The 1991 season was the 71st season of competitive football (soccer) in Estonia, and the last one in the Baltic country as a part of the Soviet Union. The championship began in the spring of 1991. In the First Division or Premier League ("Meistriliiga") thirteen teams played, in the Second Division ("Esiliiga") twelve teams. The Third Division played in regional groups followed by a promotion play-off on completion of the group stage.

National Leagues

Estonian SSR Football Championship

Cup Final

National Team

Births
2 January - Katrin Loo, footballer

Notes

External links
1991 season on RSSSF
RSSSF Historic Results
RSSSF National Team Results
RSSSF Baltic Cup 1991

 
Seasons in Estonian football